The 2002–03 season was Sporting Club de Portugal's 96th season in existence and the club's 69th consecutive season in the top flight of Portuguese football. In addition to the domestic league, Sporting CP participated in this season's editions of the Taça de Portugal, UEFA Champions League Qualifying rounds and UEFA Cup. The season covers the period from 1 July 2002 to 30 June 2003.

Season Summary
As defending league winners, the club collapsed in this season, finishing a massive 27 points behind league leader Jose Mourinho's FC Porto. This was mainly due to issues in their attacking line, including an Mario Jardel injury in January. In Europe the team was eliminated early; in August the side was knocked out of the UEFA Champions League Qualifying round by Inter Milan. After that, in September Serbian club Partizan FK defeated Sporting in the UEFA Cup first round. At the end of the season 18-yr-old midfielder Cristiano Ronaldo left the club to be transferred to Manchester United.

Squad

Competitions

Primeira Liga

Standings

Results by round

Matches

UEFA Champions League

Qualifying phase

Third qualifying round

UEFA Cup

First round

Statistics

Players statistics

References

External links

Sporting CP seasons
Sporting CP